Povodje is a small dispersed settlement south of Vodice in the Upper Carniola region of Slovenia. It includes the hamlets of Cestni Rebov and Gmajniški Rebov.

Geography
The settlement consists of two groups of houses in a valley. Little Peak (485 m) rises above the settlement, and Gameljščica Creek flows through the settlement, fed by two tributaries: Poljšak and Dobraca creeks. The soil is loamy and there are fields on the west side of the settlement.

History
The remains of a Roman fortification in the Povodje attest to early settlement of the area. In 1953, the Slovenian Fishing Association built a trout hatchery along Gameljščica Creek at the site of an abandoned mill.

Cultural heritage

A plague column stands at the north edge of the settlement, at the border with neighboring Skaručna and the intersection with the road to Vojsko. The column is carved from sandstone and is believed to date from the 17th century.

Notable people
Notable people that were born or lived in Povodje include:
Matej Hubad (1866–1937), composer

References

External links
Povodje on Geopedia

Populated places in the Municipality of Vodice